The Free State of Oldenburg was a federated state that existed during the Weimar Republic and Nazi Germany. It was established in 1918 following the abdication of the Grand Duke Frederick Augustus II after the German Revolution and was abolished by the Allies following the Second World War.

Government 
The state parliament consisted of a landtag with a fluctuating number of members but not more than 48, elected for a term of three years by universal suffrage. The state administration, headed by a Minister-President, was responsible to the landtag and could be removed by a vote of no confidence. For most of the Weimar period, due to the political stalemate in the landtag with neither the parties of the left nor the right able to form a stable parliamentary coalition, the state governments usually were headed by non-partisan technocrats.

From 1925 to 1927, following Bavaria's lead, Oldenburg was one of many German states that issued a ban on Adolf Hitler's participation in public meetings. However, in the May 1932 landtag election, the Nazi Party became the largest party with 48% of the vote and captured a majority of the landtag seats, for the first time in any German state. When the Nazi Party Gauleiter of Gau Weser-Ems, Carl Röver, became Minister-President on 16 June 1932, Oldenburg became one of only five states to have installed a Nazi-led government before the Nazis came to power nationally.

Following their seizure of power at the national level, the Nazi government enacted the "Second Law on the Coordination of the States with the Reich" that established more direct control over the states by means of the new powerful position of Reichsstatthalter (Reich Governor). Röver was installed in this post for both Oldenburg and Bremen on 5 May 1933 and was succeeded as Minister-President by Georg Joel. When Röver died on 15 May 1942, Paul Wegener became Reichsstatthalter.

Rulers of Oldenburg

Minister-Presidents 
 1918–1919 Bernhard Kuhnt (USPD)
 1919–1923 Theodor Tantzen (DDP)
 1923–1930 Eugen von Finckh (non-partisan)
 1930–1932 Friedrich Cassebohm (non-partisan)
 1932–1933 Carl Röver (NSDAP)
 1933–1945 Georg Joel (NSDAP)
 1945–1946 Theodor Tantzen (FDP)

Reichsstatthalter 
 1933–1942 Carl Röver (NSDAP)
 1942–1945 Georg Joel (NSDAP)

Territorial changes 
The state originally consisted of the main district of Oldenburg Land, as well as the two exclaves of Eutin near the Baltic coast and Birkenfeld in southwestern Germany. As a result of the Greater Hamburg Act it lost both exclave districts to Prussia and gained the City of Wilhelmshaven in return, effective 1 April 1937.
 
After the war, Oldenburg was part of the British occupation zone. It lost its status as a separate German state when it was merged into the newly founded state of Lower Saxony as the administrative region (Verwaltungsbezirk) of Oldenburg, and became a part of West Germany upon its establishment in May 1949. The two exclaves became part of the states of Schleswig-Holstein and Rhineland-Palatinate, respectively.

See also
 Duchy of Oldenburg
 Oldenburg (state)
 Oldenburg Landtag elections in the Weimar Republic
 Rulers of Oldenburg

References 

1918 establishments in Germany
1946 disestablishments in Germany
Former republics
Former states and territories of Lower Saxony
Oldenburg
FreeState
Oldenburg